Ebenavia is a small genus of geckos from Madagascar, Comoros, and Tanzania. It currently has 6 species.

Species
The 6 species are:
Ebenavia boettgeri  
Ebenavia inunguis  — Madagascar clawless gecko
Ebenavia maintimainty 
Ebenavia robusta 
Ebenavia safari 
Ebenavia tuelinae

References

 
Geckos
Taxa named by Oskar Boettger
Lizard genera